M. Katherine Banks is an American engineer and the 26th president of Texas A&M University as of June 1, 2021, having been nominated for the position on March 3, 2021, and confirmed by the Board of Regents on March 31, 2021. She is an Elected Fellow of the American Society of Civil Engineers, was elected in 2014 to the National Academy of Engineering, and was formerly the Jack and Kay Hockema Professor at Purdue University. Her research interests include applied microbial systems, biofilm processes, wastewater treatment and reuse, and phytoremediation bioremediation. She received her Ph.D. in 1989 from Duke University.

On February 13, 2019, she was named to the Board of Directors of Halliburton.

Education and career 
Banks received her Bachelor of Science in engineering in environmental engineering from the University of Florida in 1982, Master of Science in engineering in environmental engineering from the University of North Carolina at Chapel Hill in 1985, and Doctorate of Philosophy in civil and environmental engineering from Duke University in 1989.

Banks was an associate professor at Kansas State University from 1989 to 1997. From 1997 to 2012, she was a professor in the Department of Civil Engineering at Purdue University. She was the Jack and Kay Hockema Professor at Purdue and later the Bowen Engineering Head of the School of Civil Engineering. Since 2012, Banks has been at Texas A&M, where she currently serves as the 26th president of Texas A&M University and the Vice Chancellor of National Laboratories and National Security Strategic Initiatives. Prior to assuming the presidency in June 2021, Banks held the roles of Vice Chancellor of Engineering and National Laboratories for The Texas A&M University System, Dean of the College of Engineering at Texas A&M University, Director of the Texas A&M Engineering Experiment Station, University Distinguished Professor, and Harold J. Haynes Dean's Chair Professor.

Awards 
 American Society of Civil Engineers Petersen Outstanding Woman of the Year Award. 
American Society of Civil Engineers Rudolph Hering Medal, 2010.
 Rudolph Hering Medal conferred by American Society of Civil Engineers
 Oil and Gas Investor's 25 Influential Women in Energy Pinnacle Award
 Purdue Faculty Scholar Award
 Sloan Foundation Mentoring Fellowship
 American Association of University Women Fellowship.
 National Academy of Engineering Membership

References

Year of birth missing (living people)
Living people
Presidents of Texas A&M University
Texas A&M University faculty
21st-century American engineers
University of Florida alumni
University of North Carolina alumni
Duke University Pratt School of Engineering alumni
Place of birth missing (living people)
American women engineers
Purdue University faculty
Fellows of the American Society of Civil Engineers
21st-century women engineers
American women academics
21st-century American women
Women heads of universities and colleges